Damon Bansais (born 8 January 1994) is a French professional footballer who plays as a right-back for  club FBBP01 on loan from Quevilly-Rouen.

Club career
A youth product of Laval, Bansais moved to Pau FC in 2015 and helped them get promoted into the Ligue 2 in 2020. Bansais made his professional debut with Pau in a 3–0 Ligue 2 loss to Valenciennes FC on 22 August 2020.

Bansais terminated his contract with Pau in January 2021, signing for Quevilly-Rouen, where he rejoined his former coach at Pau, Bruno Irles.

On 3 January 2023, Bansais was loaned to FBBP01.

References

External links
 

1994 births
People from Laval, Mayenne
Sportspeople from Mayenne
Footballers from Pays de la Loire
Living people
French footballers
Association football fullbacks
Pau FC players
US Quevilly-Rouen Métropole players
Football Bourg-en-Bresse Péronnas 01 players
Ligue 2 players
Championnat National players
Championnat National 2 players
Championnat National 3 players